The Institute for Liquid Atomization and Spray Systems, (ILASS), is an organization of researchers, industrial practitioners and students engaged in professional activities connected with the spraying of liquids and slurries. Annual technical conferences are organized by each of the ILASS organizations ILASS-Americas, ILASS-Asia, and ILASS-Europe.  ILASS-International is an overarching coordinating board made up of representatives from the three regional ILASS Institutes.

ILASS meetings have practitioner and researchers from many areas where spray technology is utilized.  This includes injectors for gas turbines, rockets, and diesels, agricultural and medical sprays, industrial sprays, fire protection, paint and coating applications, and many others.  This breadth of spray applications at this conference and technical community provides cross-fertilization of research methodologies and innovative efforts.  Mechanical, agricultural and chemical engineers all participate in these meetings.

The community embraces the synergy of experimental, theoretical and computational models to advance the technology and science.  Presentations include experimental evaluation of spray systems and spray nozzles under a variety of applications.  Recent advances in instrumentation for drop size, drop velocity, and quantified spray pattern continue to result in advances in the state of the art.  In addition, film thickness and fuel vapor are important parameters in many applications.

Advances in computational fluid dynamics modeling, such as RANS or LES, and specialized codes (based on the volume of fluid method, level-set method or lattice Boltzmann methods)  developed to simulate the atomization and drop transport processes are presented. Modeling includes the flow phenomena inside the atomizer and the nearer nozzle and application region of the spray.  Advances in modeling efforts continue to yield significant benefits in design and optimization of spray systems. Also, chemically reacting systems are considered.

External links
Official website
Official website of ILASS-International
Official website of ILASS - Europe

Engineering societies